Chamot is a surname. Notable people with the surname include:

Janine Chamot (born 1983), Swiss footballer
José Chamot (born 1969), Argentine footballer and manager
Mary Chamot (1899–1993), English art historian and museum curator